Phacelia mohavensis is a species of phacelia known by the common name Mojave phacelia. It is endemic to southern California, where it is mostly limited to the San Gabriel Mountains and San Bernardino Mountains. It grows in the forests and wooded slopes of the mountains in sandy and gravelly substrates.

Description
Phacelia mohavensis is an annual herb producing a mostly unbranched erect stem up to 25 centimeters tall. It is glandular and coated lightly in stiff hairs. The leaves are linear or lance-shaped, smooth-edged, and up to 4.5 centimeters in length.

The hairy, glandular inflorescence is a one-sided curving or coiling cyme of bell-shaped flowers. Each flower is just under a centimeter long and white to pale blue in color with a yellowish tubular throat. It has a calyx of long, narrow, fuzzy-haired sepals.

External links
Jepson Manual Treatment — Phacelia mohavensis
Phacelia mohavensis — Photo gallery

mohavensis
Endemic flora of California
Natural history of the California chaparral and woodlands
Natural history of the Transverse Ranges
~
~
Flora without expected TNC conservation status